Milnerton is a seaside suburb on Table Bay and is located north of central Cape Town in South Africa. It is located 11 kilometres to the north of the city's centre.

Suburbs 
Suburbs/neighbourhoods of the greater Milnerton area include:
 Bothasig
 Brooklyn
 Century City
 Edgemead
 Joe Slovo Park
 Lagoon Beach 
 Marconi Beam
 Metro Industrial Township 
 Milnerton Ridge
 Montague Gardens 
 Monte Vista 
 Paarden Eiland
 Phoenix 
 Plattekloof Glen
 Rugby
 Sanddrift 
 Summer Greens
 Sunset Beach 
 Sunset Links
 Tijgerhof
 Woodbridge Island

Milnerton lagoon
One of the most identifiable features of Milnerton is its lagoon, formed where the Diep River enters the sea, with palm trees adorning the lagoon banks.

Woodbridge Island
Woodbridge Island is not actually an island, but rather the area south of Milnerton Golf Club on the peninsula separating the lagoon from the ocean. Two bridges join Woodbridge Island to the mainland of Milnerton proper. The wooden bridge is now a national heritage site, the bridge went through an upgrade phase and has since been reopened to the public. A newer bridge allows cars to cross to the island. The Milnerton Lighthouse is also a popular landmark found on the island. The beach is a popular recreational area, especially over weekends and public holidays.

Milnerton beach
Milnerton's beach is well known for its view of Table Mountain and is a popular surfing spot. The water is generally cold as a result of the Benguela current that flows along Africa's western shore. The beach is also managed by Milnerton Surf Lifesaving Club, who help to prevent drownings on the beach and surrounding area. Every Wednesday during summer the surfski and stand up paddlers use the SE winds and race the Downwind Dash series to Big Bay beach.

Nature reserves 
Milnerton is the location of two nature reserves which are owned and managed by the City of Cape Town. The Table Bay Nature Reserve Milnerton Racecourse Section is situated inside the race tracks of the old Milnerton Racecourse.

Coat of arms
Milnerton had its own municipality from 1955 to 1996.  The town council assumed a coat of arms, designed by Cornelis Pama, in October 1963, and registered it with the Cape Provincial Administration in February 1966 and at the Bureau of Heraldry in February 1968. 

The arms were : Per chevron ploye Or with two horse-shoe  Gules, and barry wavy of eight Azure and Argent (i.e. the shield was divided by a curved chevron-shaped line, the upper part displaying two red horseshoes on a gold background and the lower part having eight silver and blue stripes with wavy edges).

The crest was a red demi-horse and the motto Per mare per terram.

References
Milnerton.info. Accessed 28 April 2006.

External links

Milnerton.org - Latest news and information about Milnerton
Live web cam views onto the Milnerton Lagoon and Cape Town
Milnerton Central Residents Association

Suburbs of Cape Town